Elections for the Brisbane City Council in Queensland, Australia, were held on Saturday, 15 March 2008 to elect a councillor to each of the local government area's 26 wards and the direct election of the Lord Mayor of Brisbane.

The election resulted in the re-election of Campbell Newman of the Liberal Party as Lord Mayor, defeating Labor's Greg Rowell in a landslide with 66.1% of the mayoral two-party-preferred vote. The Liberals also won control of the council chambers, taking 5 wards from Labor for a total of 16 to Labor's 10.

Results

Mayoral election

Councillor elections

References 

2008
2008 elections in Australia
2000s in Brisbane
March 2008 events in Australia